Who Sleeps My Bro is a 2016 Chinese coming-of-age comedy-drama film directed by Zhang Qi, starring Chen Xiao, Qin Lan, Calvin Tu, Liu Ruilin and Li Xian and based on a 2001 song. It was released in China by Le Vision Pictures on April 1, 2016.

Cast
Chen Xiao
Qin Lan
Calvin Tu
Liu Ruilin
Li Xian
Yu Xintian
Lan Yingying
Jiang Xueming
Wang Xiaokun

Reception

References

Chinese coming-of-age films
Le Vision Pictures films
Films set in Shanghai
Films based on songs
Chinese comedy-drama films
2010s coming-of-age comedy-drama films